HMS Bonaventure was a submarine depot ship of the Royal Navy. She was initially built for civilian service with the Clan Line, but on the outbreak of the Second World War she was requisitioned by the Navy and after being launched, was converted for military service.

Career

Construction and commissioning
The ship was laid down at the yards of the Greenock & Grangemouth Dockyard Company, of Greenock, Scotland as a Clan Line . She was provisionally allocated the name Clan Campbell. With the outbreak of war, Admiralty requisitioned her for the Royal Navy, and after her launch on 27 October 1942, she was converted at the yards of Scotts Shipbuilding and Engineering Company to become a submarine depot ship for the  midget submarines. After the conversion was completed she was commissioned into the Navy on 26 January 1943.

Early wartime service
After completing work-up trials, Bonaventure sailed to Loch Striven on the west bank of the Clyde to become the main training base and depot ship for the X craft midget submarines.

Despite a number of the X craft being lost, the operation was a success and Tirpitz was put out of action for six months. In October Bonaventure sailed to Govan to be refitted at the yards of Alexander Stephen and Sons. The refit took until 2 January 1944 and included fitting new radar equipment. Some work was not completed before Bonaventure was recommissioned on 22 January to serve with the British Pacific Fleet. She again deployed at Loch Striven in preparation. She remained deployed there until March, when she returned to Govan to complete the outstanding dockyard work. The refit lasted until August, when after post-refit trials, she returned to Loch Striven in September. October to November was spent training on the loch. During this period, the modified s, which had been under construction since January 1944, became available. Several were embarked aboard Bonaventure for use against targets in the Far East. In December she was nominated for deployment as the depot ship for the 14th Submarine Flotilla in the south west Pacific.

Pacific theatre
Bonaventures departure was initially delayed, and in January she embarked six XE type submarines. She left the United Kingdom on 21 February, sailing for Australia via the Panama Canal. After going through the canal, she crossed the Pacific, arriving at Pearl Harbor on 7 March. The attitude of the United States Navy was discouraging, and the use of midget submarines was not looked on with much enthusiasm. Bonaventure arrived at Brisbane on 27 April and received approval to move nearer to the operational area and to approach the local US Navy authorities. She subsequently sailed to Townsville, Queensland in May, where a visit was made by a senior officer of the 14th Flotilla to the US Navy Base at Subic Bay. The Americans remained sceptical and suggested that Bonaventure be converted to perform a wider support role. On 31 May the proposal was made to use midget submarines to cut Japanese underwater telegraph cables.

Bonaventure was transferred to Hervey Bay, Queensland in June, and then to an area south of Townsville, to prepare for the cable cutting operations. She carried out extensive training and experiments off the coast of Mon Repos using a disused telegraph cable between Australia and New Caledonia. During these exercises, two divers (Lt Bruce Enzer and Lt Bruce Carey) died after suffering oxygen poisoning. After the operational targets had been selected, Bonaventure sailed to Labuan, Borneo. Throughout July she prepared for three operations. Operation Foil aimed to cut telegraph cables off Lamma Island, Hong Kong, and Operation Sabre was intended to cut telegraph cables at Cap St Jacques, off Saigon. These cables were vital to Japanese signal security as radio signals could be deciphered by US code breakers.

The operations began on 26 July. HMS Stygian towed  and  towed  for Operation Struggle. Takao was badly damaged, sinking to the seabed, but the attack on Myōkō failed. For Operation Sabre,  towed , which succeeded in cutting two cables and bringing sections back to Bonaventure. XE5 was able to reach the target under her own power and succeeded in severing the cable. The submarines returned in tow to Bonaventure on 3, 4 and 5 August. Bonaventures last activity before the end of the war was to sail to Sydney from Labuan on 20 August.

Postwar
Bonaventure returned to the UK, and remained in Royal Navy service for a further three years. She was placed on the disposal list in 1948, and sold back to the Clan Line on 23 March 1948. She was converted back to mercantile use, and re-entered service as Clan Davidson. She was sold in 1963 and arrived at Hong Kong for scrapping on 25 December 1963.

Citations

References

External links
 HMS Bonaventure's wartime career
 HMS Bonaventure at Uboat.net
 The wartime services of the Cameron class

1942 ships
Cameron-class steamships
Ships built on the River Clyde
Auxiliary ships of the Royal Navy
Royal Navy Submarine Depot Ships